Central Equatoria is a state in South Sudan. Its previous name was Bahr al-Jabal (also Bahr-el-Jebel), named after a tributary of the White Nile that flows through the state. It was renamed Central Equatoria in the first Interim Legislative Assembly on 1 April 2005 under the government of Southern Sudan. Central Equatoria seceded from Sudan as part of the Republic of South Sudan on 9 July 2011. The state's capital, Juba, is also the national capital of South Sudan. On October 2, 2015, the state was split into three states: Jubek, Terekeka, and Yei River. The state of Central Equatoria was re-established by a peace agreement signed on 22 February 2020.

Administrative divisions 
Central Equatoria, like other states in South Sudan, is subdivided into counties, which are further divided into Payams, then Bomas. Each county is led by a County Commissioner, appointed by the State Governor in consultation with the President. They are:
Juba County
Lainya County
Morobo County
Terekeka County
Yei River County
Kajo Keji County

Major cities and towns of Central Equatoria include Juba, Kajo Keji, Liria, Mongalla, Wonduruba, Rokon, Tali, Terekeka, Yei, Ji-Menze, Tombek, Tindilo, Kaya, Muni, Morobo, and Rijong. The major border crossing to the neighboring Democratic Republic of the Congo is at Dimo, a village in the state.

Demographics 
Major tribes of Central Equatoria have included the Mandari, Pojulu, Kakwa, Keliko, Kuku, Lugbara, Avukaya, Baka, Nyangwara, Adio, and Lulubo. Minor tribes have included the Nyepo in Northern Kajo Keji County and the Lokoya along the Nimule Road. Erasto Gonda, Senior Folklore Officer for Central Equatoria's information ministry, further detailed the State's demographics:

Culture and languages 
Due to the South Sudanese Civil War, the state's culture was heavily influenced by the countries neighboring South Sudan. Many South Sudanese fled to Ethiopia, Kenya and Uganda, where they interacted with the nationals and learned their languages and culture. Most of those who remained in the country or went north to Sudan and Egypt assimilated into Arab culture.

It is also worth noting that most South Sudanese diaspore kept the core of their culture even while in exile. Traditional culture is highly held and great attention is given to knowing one's origin and dialect. Although the common languages spoken are Juba Arabic and English, Swahili began to be introduced to the population to improve the country's relations with its East African neighbors. Many people from Central Equatoria use English, Kiswahili, Juba Arabic, their dialect, or a mixture of the languages mentioned.

Government 
Directly before Central Equatoria split up into three separate states in 2015, the government was as shown:
Governor – Emmanuel Adil Anthony
Deputy Governor – Sarah Nene Redento

Advisors 

 Angelo Daya Loku, peace and security (SSOA)
 David Wani, Economic affairs (IO)
 Jacob Gore Samuel, Legal Affairs (IG)
 JeniferYobu, Human Rights (IG)
 Mariam A. Zachariah, Fever and social welfare (IG)

Ministers 

 Hon. Wayi Godwin Edward, Minister of Cabinet Affairs (IO)
 Hon. Moro Isaac Geneios, Minister of Local Government and Law Enforcement (SSOA)
 Hon. Gerald Francis Nyukuye, Minister of Peace Building (IG)
 Hon. Taban Emmanuel Baya, Minister of parliamentary and Legal Affairs (IO)
 Hon. Andruga Mabe Severio, Minister of Information and Communication (OPP)
 Hon. Rita Dominic Lado, Minister of Culture, Youth and Sports (IG)
 Hon. Diana Susu Hassan, Minister of Finance, Planning, and Investment ( IG)
 Hon. Wani Tom Sebit, Minister of Trade and Industry (IG)
 Hon. Lily Kufuki Paul, Ministry of Agriculture, Environment, and Forestry (SSOA)
 Hon. Alex Latio Elia, Minister of Animal Resources, Fisheries and Tourism (IG)
 Hon Peter Lujo Yospeta, Minister of Cooperative and Rural Development (IO)
 Hon. Flora Gabriel Modi, Minister of Housing, Land and Public Utilities (IG)
 Hon. Mawa A. Moses, Minister of Roads and Bridges (IG)
 Hon. Modi John Molla, Minister of Labor, public services and Human Resource (IG)
 Hon. Nejua Marsha, Minister of Heath (IG)
 Hon. Cirisio  Zachariah, Minister of General Education and Instruction (IO)
 Hon. Bullen Soro Amos, Minister of Gender, Child and Social Welfare (IG)

Independent Commissions 

 George Wani Elia, Anti- corruption (IO) deputized by Kenyi Abiaso
 Asio Moses John, employees justice chamber (IO) deputized by Huda Michael Laila
 Marino Michael Sebit, HIV/AIDS (SSOA)
 Felix Lado Johnson, PRC (IG) deputized by Amal Suleiman
 Isaac Wuri Eluni, Human Rights (IG) deputized by Emmanuel kose Wani (IO)
 Henry Kala Sabuni, Conflict Resolution and Reconciliation (IG) deputized by Amule Barnabas Lemi

County commissioners 

 Hon. Charles Joseph Wani, Juba county ( SSOS)
 Hon. Aggrey Cyrus, Yei River County (IG)
 Hon. Joseph Mawa, Morobo County(IG)
 Hon. James Lino Malou Anok, Terekeka county(IO)
 Hon. Emmauel Khamis Richard, Lainya County (IG)
 Hon. Kenyi Erasto Michael, Kajo-Keji (IO)

See also 
 Mundari people
 Bari people (South Sudan)
 Pojulu Tribe
 Keliko People
 Equatoria
 Western Equatoria
 Eastern Equatoria

References 

 South Sudan Internet radio
 Interview with Erasto Gonda 'Tribes Of Central Equatoria' 
 'GLOBAL: Protect rights of minorities to avoid conflict, NGO urges.' 
 'Violence, Sacrifice, and Chiefship in Central Equatoria Southern Sudan.'

External links 
 Video of Equatorians Abroad
 Equatorians Abroad
 UNHCR Sudan Operations: Sudan/Chad situation update 42, 8 Dec 2005 describing name change
 State Government Profile

 
States of South Sudan